The Bend Park & Recreation District is the agency which protects the parks, natural areas, recreational facilities, gardens, and trails of the city of Bend, Oregon.

History
Bend formed a recreation department and hired its first director in April 1949. Before then, summer youth activities were organized jointly with the local school district. Sites were maintained by the public works department until 1964 when the maintenance and recreation programs combined to form a new Parks and Recreation Department.

Sites

 Al Moody – 2225 NE Daggett Lane
 Alpine – SW Swarens Ave./Century Drive
 Awbrey Village – 3015 NE Merchant Way
 Bend Senior Center – 1600 SE Reed Market Road
 Big Sky Park – Luke Damon Sports Complex – 21690 NE Neff Road
 Blakely Park – 1155 SW Brookswood Blvd.
 Boyd Park – 20750 NE Comet St
 Brooks Park – 35 NW Drake Road
 Columbia Park – 264 SW Columbia Street
 Compass Park – 2500 NW Crossing Drive
 Davis Park Site – Revere Street (end)
 Deschutes River Trail
 District Office – 799 SW Columbia Street
 Dohema River Access – NW Drake and Dohema Streets
 Drake Park and Mirror Pond – 777 NW Riverside Blvd.
 Farewell Bend Park – 1000 SW Reed Market Road
 First Street Rapids Park – West First and Vicksburg Streets
 Foxborough Park – 61308 Sunflower Lane
 Gardenside Park – 61750 Darla Place
 Harmon Park – 1100 NW Harmon Road
 Harvest Park – 63240 Lavacrest St.
 High Desert Park Site – Knott Road/27th
 Hillside I Park – 2050 NW 12th Street
 Hillside II Park – 910 NW Saginaw Avenue
 Hixon Park – 125 SW Crowell Way
 Hollinshead Park – 1235 NE Jones Rd
 Hollygrape Park – 19489 SW Hollygrape Street
 Jaycee Park – 478 Railroad Street
 Juniper Park – 800 NE 6th
 Juniper Swim & Fitness Center – 800 NE 6th St.
 Kiwanis Park – 800 SE Centennial Blvd.
 Larkspur Park – 1700 SE Reed Market Road
 Larkspur Trail – 1600 SE Reed Market Road
 Lewis & Clark Park – 2520 NW Lemhi Pass Drive
 McKay Park – 166 SW Shevlin Hixon Drive
 Mountain View Park – 1975 NE Providence Drive
 Orchard Park – 2001 NE 6th Street
 Overturf Park – 475 NW 17th Street
 Pacific Park – 200 NW Pacific Park Lane
 Pageant Park – 691 Drake Road
 Park Services Center – 1675 SW Simpson
 Pilot Butte Neighborhood Park – 1310 NE Highway 20
 Pine Nursery Park – 3750 NE Purcell Blvd.
 Pine Ridge Park – 61250 Linfield Ct
 Pine Tree Park Site – Intersection of Purcell Street and Empire Ave.
 Pioneer Park – 1525 Wall Street
 Ponderosa Park – 225 SE 15th Street
 Providence Park – 1055 NE Providence Drive
 Quail Park – 2755 NW Regency Street
 River Canyon Park – 61005 Snowbrush Drive
 River Rim Park Site – River Rim Drive
 Riverbend Park – 799 SW Columbia Street
 Riverview Park – 225 NE Division Street
 Rock Ridge Park Site – NE 18th Street
 Sawyer Park – 62999 O.B. Riley Road
 Sawyer Uplands Park – 700 NW Yosemite Drive
 Shevlin Park – 18920 Shevlin Park Road
 Skyline Sports Complex – 19617 Mountaineer Way
 Stover Park – 1650 NE Watson Drive
 Summit Park – 1150 NW Promontory Drive
 Sun Meadow Park – 61150 Dayspring Drive
 Sunset View Park – 990 Stannium Street
 Sylvan Park – 2996 NW Three Sisters Drive
 Three Pines Park – 19089 Mt Hood Place
 Tillicum Park/Chase Ranch – 18144 Couch Market Road
 Vince Genna Stadium – SE 5th and Roosevelt Avenue
 Wildflower Park – 60955 River Rim Drive
 Woodriver Park – 61690 Woodriver Drive

See also
 Bend Whitewater Park

References

External links

 Bend Park & Recreation District

Culture of Bend, Oregon
Local government in Oregon
Park districts in Oregon
Parks in Deschutes County, Oregon